Hart Lake is a lake in Hubbard County, in the U.S. state of Minnesota.

Hart Lake was so named from the fact its outline is shaped like a heart.

See also
List of lakes in Minnesota

References

Lakes of Minnesota
Lakes of Hubbard County, Minnesota